Bestshoring, also known as rightshoring, is the process of identifying the best location to move manufacturing, IT or business processes for a company. The decision is to be based on quantifiable criteria which are intended to take subjective and political input out of the decision cycle. Many companies use external consulting firms to make these decisions.

On August 1, 2004, Hillary Clinton wrote an article explaining why bestshoring beats outsourcing. Her argument is that "Foreign labor isn't as cheap as it seems."

See also
Offshoring

External links
 'Bestshoring' Beats Outsourcing by Hillary Rodham Clinton.

Business terms